V. californica  may refer to:
 Vauquelinia californica, the Arizona rosewood, a plant species  found in the southwestern portion of the US, in Baja California and Baja California Sur
 Verbena californica, the California vervain or Red Hills vervain, a plant species endemic to California
 Vitis californica, the California wild grape, a wild grape species native to most of California and southwestern Oregon
 Vrilletta californica, a beetle species

See also
 List of Latin and Greek words commonly used in systematic names#C